Crime is present in various forms in Vietnam. According to the United States 2016 OSAC Crime report, Hanoi is rated as medium in Overall Crime and Safety Situation.

History of organised crime 
 

Among the first organised crime group to emerge in Vietnam were the Bình Xuyên, which during the 1920s acted mainly as river pirates led by Dương Văn Dương, before later becoming a legitimate military organization that nearly controlled the entire supply of opium of Vietnam in 1954. With the arrival of Vietnamese independence in 1945 (in the North) and 1955 (in the South), organized crime activity, including protection rackets, were drastically reduced as both the Northern and Southern governments purged criminal activity in their halves of the country. In spite of this, organized crime continued to persist in both halves of Vietnam.

In the South, during the 1960s, the underworld of Saigon at the time was defined by the "Four Great Kings" period, where the city was ruled by the four top powerful mobsters who presided over much of the organized criminal activities and rackets within the city, such as the drug dens, prostitution houses, night clubs and casinos. These four gangsters were Đại Cathay, Huỳnh Tỳ, Ngô Văn Cái and Ba Thế, referred with veneration by a Vietnamese saying "Nhất Đại – nhì Tỳ - tam Cái – tứ Thế". These venerations refer to each of the four mobsters respectively by their level of dominance, with Đại Cathay referred to as being the king among kings in the city. Following 1975 and the reunification of Vietnam, the era of the Four Great Kings period came to and end, but Năm Cam would later come to form a dominant criminal group in Saigon during the 90s, where he was known for running numerous gambling dens, hotels, and restaurants that fronted for brothels, being said to have been going on a 15-year killing spree in Saigon where he eliminated his rivals. As such, he is often referred to as the godfather of Vietnam.

Meanwhile, in the North, organized crime also existed, but it was much more masked from the general public and the government's eye, due to the North's more stringent control over organized criminal activity alongside stricter law enforcement. In spite of this, organized crime still managed to exist, most notably in the incidence of Khánh Trắng, the former President of the Đồng Xuân Labor Union in Hanoi, which was the first non-state trade organization in the city. At his height, Khánh Trắng's organization had received praise from the northern government officials as a model example of an organization that should be replicated. However, underneath the guise of operating a legal labor union, Khánh Trắng started to transform the union into a something like an organized crime group that extorted from the merchants in the Đồng Xuân market and creating unfair policies that usually resulted in fines against the local merchants, in which Khánh profited from.

Another well known organized crime figure that originated from the North was Dung Hà, who was a female gangster from the city of Haiphong where she originally ran an illicit casino business alongside gaining numerous followers or disciples behind her. Other gangsters such as Hải Bánh also originated from the North, but some of them like Hải and Dung Hà later took their operations to the south in order to expand their operations and become wealthier.

In the modern era, organized crime in Vietnam is mostly concentrated in the northern regions such as in Hạ Long City and the nearby port city of Haiphong which are notorious for being hotbeds of organized crime groups that engage in activities such as smuggling, prostitution, drugs, and a myriad of other criminal activities. The Vietnamese mafia was nicknamed "the snake". Inside these organizations is a rigid hierarchy, iron discipline and total control over each member of community established.

Crimes against tourists
Petty crime, which includes pick-pocketing and snatch theft, is common in Vietnam, especially near airports, sea ports and train stations. Traveling alone in remote areas after dark is of risk especially to foreigners. Violent crime is a growing issue; most cases of it are reported in the more developed areas of the country, such as Ho Chi Minh City or Hanoi. 

Scams are common in the country, and some of the most common ones include fake taxis/taxi scams, cyclo scams, fraudulent tour companies, shoe shine scam, fruit photo taking scam, massage scam and shopping scams. 

Foreign travellers have also reported attempts at sexual assault on fake motorcycle taxis (xe ôm) passed off as real ones. There are counterfeit and unauthorized merchandise which can be easily found in many areas of Vietnam.

Sex trafficking and prostitution

Prostitution is against the law in the Socialist Republic of Vietnam. Nevertheless, some women in the country are prostitutes, either willingly or unwillingly. As many females in the country are stricken with poverty, selling their body is deemed as one of, if not the only, option for them. One source estimates the number of prostitutes in Vietnam to be 20,000 to 70,000.

A number of women and girls from all ethnic groups and foreigners have been victims of sex trafficking in Vietnam. They are forced into prostitution or marriages.

Corruption and police misconduct

The Vietnamese government is making an effort to curb corruption in the country. A handful of corrupt individuals, ranging from law enforcers to politicians, have been arrested. The police force in Vietnam is known to go overboard and there have been reports of the police assaulting unarmed individuals. On July 23, 2010, while in detainment for a small offense (helmetless driving of motorcycle), 21-year-old Nguyen Van Khuong ultimately lost his life when officers reportedly physically attacked him. The misuse of ferocity has raised concerns from the Human Rights Watch.

See also
Nguyễn Văn Minh Tiến
Golden Triangle

References